HM Prison Dhurringile is a minimum security prison located in Dhurringile, Victoria, Australia. Situated 160 km north of Melbourne near Murchison, it is based around the historic Dhurringile estate.

Facilities
The Dhurringile mansion has not been used to house prisoners since 2007 when new buildings were opened. The main unit is called Kyabram and houses 54 prisoners in cell accommodations. The unit has two sides, South and North. South is the reception side, where all new arrivals are housed prior to being moved into cottage accommodation. The North side is for medical hold prisoners who need to be located within the unit on a permanent basis.

The prison also contains cottages in both C1 and C2 classifications. The C1 cottages are: Merrigum (1, 2 and 3) Kyouga (1 and 2) Echuca (1, 2 and 3) Tatchera (1, 2 and 3) and Tallygaropna (1 and 2) Each C1 cottage houses six prisoners who each have their own bedroom. There is a main lounge area with TV etc. The prisoners in these accommodations collect their meals from the main mess hall every day as there are no cooking facilities located within the cottage. There are 3 C1 self-catered units where cooking is done within the unit.

There are 3 main C2 units called Garnya (1, 2 and 3) Dhugalla (1, 2 and 3) and Benalla (1, 2 and 3); these units are fully self catered. Each prisoner has their own bedroom and there is a large kitchen and living area. The units have two bathrooms and two toilets. Food for these units is ordered off a grocery list and the unit is allocated $275 per week to buy groceries. Prisoners from these units are not permitted to attend at the mess hall for any meals.

There is a 12-bed unit called 'Wyuna" for long-term C2 prisoners coming to the end of their sentences. You must be selected to go into this unit, you simply cannot ask to be placed there. The unit is made up of bedrooms with en suites. The unit is unlocked at night as with any c2 unit but prisoners obtain their meals from the mess hall.

Upgrades
A new kitchen, medical, library and administration building were opened in mid-2010. It is a state-of-the-art facility. Musters are now conducted on the balcony of this building as opposed to the mansion where they had previously been held. Most musters at the jail are held at the prisoners units or by their doors if they are located in Kyabram. But all work musters on Monday through Friday are held on this balcony.

A 54-bed expansion was opened by Andrew McIntosh, Minister for Corrections on 31 July 2012.

The prison continues to expand.  In January 2014,  50 converted shipping containers were established on site to house 100 prisoners.  Other expansion works are underway (early 2014) to build more permanent accommodation for Victoria's growing prisoner population.

Work
All prisoners are expected to work whilst located at the prison. There are a variety of work opportunities. The main two industries are wooden products and metal fabrication. Most prisoners are placed in these two industries upon reception. Other areas of work include Horticulture (working in the main orchards), Maintenance, Gardening, or "Billet" (cleaner) jobs.

The prison is also a working dairy farm and about 15 prisoners work in the dairy. This work includes being woken and let out of their units at 5.30 am to go and milk the cows. The dairy also goes back and milks again at about 4 pm. The dairy workers work a 6-day week with one day off. They have their own special canteen times also as they are working when other prisoners are able to attend canteen etc.

History

HM Prison Dhurringile was established in 1965 when the Government of Victoria acquired the Dhurringile mansion and former estate from the Presbyterian Church of Australia, who had used the site for the then recently-defunct Dhurringile Rural Training Farm. The site had earlier operated as an internment camp and prisoner of war camp during World War II.

Escapes
On 15 February 2010, 36-year-old, convicted armed robber Jason Campbell, escaped from the prison.

On 20 September 2013, 35-year-old Eray Aslan escaped but was found on 1 October 2013 in a Footscray home.

On 1 August 2014, 28-year-old Vikramjit Singh escaped from the prison.

See also

List of Australian prisons

References

External links 
  Prison Profiles - Dhurringile Prison 

1965 establishments in Australia
Prisons in Victoria (Australia)
World War II prisoner-of-war camps in Australia
World War II internment camps in Australia
Military camps in Australia